Daniel Fauché (born 22 December 1966, in Chantilly) is a French rower.

References 
 
 

1966 births
Living people
French male rowers
People from Chantilly, Oise
Rowers at the 1992 Summer Olympics
Rowers at the 1996 Summer Olympics
Rowers at the 2000 Summer Olympics
Olympic silver medalists for France
Olympic rowers of France
Olympic medalists in rowing
World Rowing Championships medalists for France
Medalists at the 1996 Summer Olympics
Sportspeople from Oise
20th-century French people